Take It from Me is an album by American jazz vibraphonist Terry Gibbs featuring performances recorded in 1964 for the Impulse! label.

Reception
The Allmusic review by Scott Yanow awarded the album 3 stars stating "This is a likable small-group date".

Track listing
All compositions by Terry Gibbs except as indicated
 "Take It from Me" - 4:21
 "El Fatso" - 3:56
 "Oge" - 3:11
 "Pauline's Place" - 2:30
 "8 LBS., 10 OZS." - 2:30
 "Gee, Dad, It's A Degan" - 6:14
 "All The Things You Are" (Jerome Kern, Oscar Hammerstein II) - 4:21
 "Honeysuckle Rose (Fats Waller, Andy Razaf) - 4:40
Recorded at Rudy Van Gelder Studio in Englewood Cliffs, New Jersey on January 16, 1964

Personnel
Terry Gibbs – vibes
Kenny Burrell – guitar
Sam Jones – bass
Louis Hayes – drums

References

Impulse! Records albums
Terry Gibbs albums
1964 albums
Albums recorded at Van Gelder Studio